Rio Preto Esporte Clube, commonly referred to as Rio Preto, is a Brazilian professional association football club based in São José do Rio Preto, São Paulo. The team competes in the Campeonato Paulista Série A3, the third tier of the São Paulo state football league.

The club's home colours are white and green and the team mascot is an alligator.

History
On April 21, 1919, Rio Preto Esporte Clube was founded.

In 1999, the club won its first title, the Campeonato Paulista Third Level, beating Oeste in the final.

In 2007, Rio Preto for the first time ever was promoted to Campeonato Paulista Série A1.

Honours

Regional
 Campeonato Paulista - Third Tier (Winners): 1963, 1999
 Campeonato Paulista - Second Tier (Runners-up): 2007

Stadium

Rio Preto Esporte Clube's home stadium is Anísio Haddad stadium, usually known as Rio Pretão, with a maximum capacity of 33,000 people.

Mascot, nickname and club colors
The club's mascot is a yacare caiman, usually known as jacaré, which is the animal's Portuguese name.

Verdão da Vila Universitária, meaning College Ville Big Green, is the club's nickname.

Rio Preto's colors are green and white.

Women's team
The women have won the national championship, the Campeonato Brasileiro de Futebol Feminino in 2015.

References

External links
 Rio Preto Esporte Clube at Arquivo de Clubes
 Official Website

 
Football clubs in São Paulo (state)
Association football clubs established in 1919
1919 establishments in Brazil